The 25th Street station was a station on the now demolished BMT Fifth Avenue Line in Brooklyn, New York City. It was served by trains of the BMT Culver Line and BMT Fifth Avenue Line. It had two tracks and one island platform. The station was opened on August 15, 1889, at Fifth Avenue and 25th Street, and was the southern terminus of the line until 1890. The next stop to the north was 20th Street. The next stop to the south was 36th Street. The station closed on May 31, 1940. Current rapid transit service in this area can be found one block west at the 25th Street station on the underground BMT Fourth Avenue Line.

References

BMT Fifth Avenue Line stations
Railway stations in the United States opened in 1889
Railway stations closed in 1940
Former elevated and subway stations in Brooklyn